Jamie Anne Allman (née Brown; born April 6, 1977) is an American actress. She is known for her role as Terry Marek on AMC's The Killing, and Connie Riesler on the FX police drama The Shield.

Early life
Allman grew up on a farm in Kansas.  Allman took acting classes at Playhouse West in Los Angeles.

Filmography

Personal life
Her husband, Marshall Allman, is also an actor. Allman delivered twin sons in 2013, and a daughter in 2014.

References

External links

20th-century American actresses
21st-century American actresses
Actresses from Kansas
American film actresses
American television actresses
Living people
People from Parsons, Kansas
1977 births